WCTK (98.1 FM, "Cat Country 98.1") is a country-formatted radio station serving Southern New England, with studios in Providence, Rhode Island, and transmitter in New Bedford, Massachusetts. The station is owned by Hall Communications.

History
WCTK was originally WFMR and had an authorized power of 20 kilowatts. It went on the air December 9, 1946; during the inaugural program, Massachusetts governor Maurice J. Tobin said that WFMR was the first new FM station to sign on in New England after World War II. In 1973, WFMR changed its callsign to WMYS, with an oldies and classic hits format. On July 28, 1989, the station switched formats to country followed by a call sign change to WCTK on August 24, 1989.  First known as "Country 98.1 WCTK," the branding was changed to the current "Cat Country 98.1" in 1994. In 1997, the station moved its studios from New Bedford to the Roland Building in Providence to concentrate on fully serving the Providence Arbitron metro.

On February 1, 2019, WCTK began being simulcast on sister station WPVD (1450 AM) in West Warwick, Rhode Island, after that station dropped its ESPN Radio affiliation. The station also began broadcasting in HD, with a simulcast of sister station WNBH's newly-launched classic hits format (Big 101.3) on its HD2 sub-channel.

References

External links

1948 list of FM radio stations, including WFMR

CTK
Country radio stations in the United States
Radio stations established in 1946
New Bedford, Massachusetts
Mass media in Bristol County, Massachusetts
1946 establishments in Massachusetts